Sir Francis Chatillon Danson  (24 November 1855 –3 July 1926) was a British average adjuster (calculating liabilities for marine insurance).

Danson was born in  Barnston, Cheshire, the son of barrister and journalist John Towne Danson (1817–1898). He was educated at Liverpool College and in Paris. He established his own firm of F. C. Danson & Co, with offices in Liverpool and London. He was a long-standing member of the Mersey Docks and Harbour Board and Liverpool Chamber of Commerce (of which he was president from 1896 to 1899), deputy treasurer of the University of Liverpool (and member of the Council from 1903 to 1918), chairman of the Birkenhead Conservative Association from 1898 to 1904, member of the Admiralty Transport Arbitration Board from 1914 until his death, and chairman of the Liverpool School of Tropical Medicine, for which he was knighted in the 1920 New Year Honours.

He died in Oxton, Birkenhead.

Footnotes

1855 births
1926 deaths
People from the Metropolitan Borough of Wirral
People educated at Liverpool College
Businesspeople in insurance
People associated with the University of Liverpool
Knights Bachelor
Businesspeople awarded knighthoods